Parasitology Research, formerly known as Zeitschrift für Parasitenkunde (German for Journal for Parasite Study) is a journal founded by Albrecht Hase (born March 16th, 1882, died November 20th, 1962), a German entomologist and parasitologist. From its inception in 1928 until 1961, he was co-publisher and editor-in-chief of the journal.

References 

Parasitology journals